Émile François Cornellie (15 August 1869 – 27 December 1945) was a Belgian sailor who competed in the 1920 Summer Olympics. He was a crew member of the Belgian boat Edelweiß, which won the gold medal in the 6-metre class (1907 rating).

References

External links
 
 
 

1869 births
1945 deaths
Belgian male sailors (sport)
Olympic sailors of Belgium
Olympic gold medalists for Belgium
Olympic medalists in sailing
Medalists at the 1920 Summer Olympics
Sailors at the 1920 Summer Olympics – 6 Metre
20th-century Belgian people